Bušić is a Croatian surname. Notable people with the surname include:

 André Bušić (1939-1978), Croatian-Brazilian musician
 Andria Busic (born 1965), Brazilian bassist and vocalist
 Bruno Bušić, Croatian writer and dissident
 Ivan Bušić Roša (1745-1783), Croatian outlaw
 Ivan Busic (born 1967), Brazilian drummer
 Julienne Bušić (born 1948), American activist and airplane hijacker
 Tomislav Bušić (born 1986), Croatian footballer
 Vesna Bušić (born 1983), Croatian-German wrestler
 Zdravka Bušić (born 1950), Croatian politician
 Zvonko Bušić (1946–2013), Croatian emigrant and airplane hijacker

Croatian surnames